Falcuna libyssa, the common marble, is a butterfly in the family Lycaenidae. It is found in Nigeria, Cameroon, Equatorial Guinea and Angola. The habitat consists of primary and secondary forests with a canopy.

Adults of both sexes feed at extrafloral nectaries of Marantaceae and other creepers.

Subspecies
Falcuna libyssa libyssa (eastern Nigeria, western Cameroon)
Falcuna libyssa angolensis Stempffer & Bennett, 1963 (northern Angola)
Falcuna libyssa cameroonica Stempffer & Bennett, 1963 (Cameroon: except the west, Equatorial Guinea: Mbini)

References

Butterflies described in 1866
Poritiinae
Butterflies of Africa
Taxa named by William Chapman Hewitson